SpeechMagic is an industrial speech recognition platform developed by Philips Speech Recognition Systems of Vienna, Austria. The name is also used by the company for services supporting information capture. The technology is mainly used in the healthcare sector, with applications available for the legal market and tax consultants.  

On October 1, 2008, Nuance Communications, Inc. announced that it had acquired Philips Speech Recognition Systems.

SpeechMagic supports 25 recognition languages and provides more than 150 ConTexts (industry-specific vocabularies). The world’s largest location using SpeechMagic is the United States with more than 60,000 authors, more than 3,000 editors and a throughput of 400 million lines per year.

References

External links
 SpeechMagic

Speech recognition software
Defunct software companies of Austria